The 2009 Internationaux de Nouvelle-Calédonie was a professional tennis tournament played on outdoor hard courts. It was part off the 2009 ATP Challenger Tour. It took place in Nouméa, New Caledonia between 5 and 11 January 2009.

Singles main-draw entrants

Seeds

 Rankings are as of 29 December 2008.

Other entrants
The following players received wildcards into the singles main draw:
  Jonathan Dasnières de Veigy
  Sébastien de Chaunac
  Florian Mayer
  Benoît Paire

The following players received entry from the qualifying draw:
  Jean-Christophe Faurel
  Riccardo Ghedin
  Dieter Kindlmann
  Alexander Slabinsky

Champions

Singles

 Brendan Evans def.  Florian Mayer, 4–6, 6–3, 6–4.

Doubles
Play cancelled due to rain.

External links
Singles Draw

Internationaux de Nouvelle-Caledonie
2009 in French tennis
Internationaux de Nouvelle-Calédonie
Inter